SS Lion was the first wooden-wall steamship in Newfoundland and Labrador, constructed in 1866. The ship's main purpose was to head back and forth within the sealing industry from the ice off Labrador to St. John's, Newfoundland. On January 6, 1882, the vessel was lost in the night while transporting goods and persons from St. John's to Trinity, Newfoundland. All people on board lost their lives.

Description
The vessel's steam engines produced 75 nominal horsepower. The vessel was owned by Walter Grieve and Co.

Service history
Lion was one of the first wooden-wall steamships operating off Newfoundland, entering service in 1867. Lion was used to sail from the sealing grounds off Labrador and St. John's, Newfoundland. Due to the ship's owners anti-Confederation views, the vessel flew a blue ensign with large white letters that read "No Confederation." In 1871, Lion brought home the crew of SS Wolf after that ship had been cut in two by an iceberg in Green Bay, Newfoundland.

Fate
On January 6, 1882 the ship left St. John's to prepare for the upcoming seal hunt. Under the command of Captain Patrick Fowlow of Trinity, Newfoundland, the ship started to make its way to Trinity. Carrying passengers and a load of coal, the ship was soon lost in the middle of the night, near Baccalieu Tickle, despite fair weather conditions. Most believe the ship exploded due to insufficient water in the boilers. The loss claimed the lives of all passengers, crew and captain. All that was found was a small amount of debris and the body of a young woman from St. John's.

References

Steamships of Canada
Shipwrecks of the Newfoundland and Labrador coast
Sealing ships